Yao Bianwa (born 20 February 1996) is a Chinese cross-country mountain biker. She competed in the 2020 Summer Olympics.

References

1996 births
Living people
People from Dingxi
Cyclists at the 2020 Summer Olympics
Chinese female cyclists
Olympic cyclists of China
Cyclists at the 2018 Asian Games
Asian Games medalists in cycling
Asian Games gold medalists for China
Medalists at the 2018 Asian Games
21st-century Chinese women